The 1490s decade ran from January 1, 1490, to December 31, 1499.

<onlyinclude>

References